Edward August Teichert (November 14, 1903 in Pennsylvania – August 1981) was an American laborer and political activist. Teichert, from Greensburg, Pennsylvania, was the Socialist Labor Party of America's nominee for President of the United States twice (1944 and 1948). 

At the time of his 1948 nomination, Teichert worked as an assistant foreman in a Greensburg electrical equipment plant.

In 1944, while running on the ticket with Arla A. Albaugh as the vice-presidential nominee, Teichert/Albaugh were on 15 state ballots and received 45,188, the most the party's presidential nominee had earned since 1900. The Communist Party USA chose not to run a candidate for president in that year.

In 1948, Teichert and vice-presidential nominee Stephen Emery were on 22 state ballots and received 29,244 votes. Teichert was forced to run on the "Industrial Government Party" in his home state of Pennsylvania due to state law prohibiting the use of the same word in two party names. Norman Thomas and the Socialist Party of America got on the ballot first in that state.

References

1903 births
1981 deaths
People from Greensburg, Pennsylvania
Socialist Labor Party of America presidential nominees
Socialist Labor Party of America politicians from Pennsylvania
Candidates in the 1944 United States presidential election
Candidates in the 1948 United States presidential election
20th-century American politicians